Alexandra Fomina (also spelled Olexandra or Oleksandra, born 4 May 1975) is a Ukrainian volleyball player. With her club Rabita Baku she competed at the 2012 FIVB Volleyball Women's Club World Championship. She was a part of the team which competed for Ukraine at the 1996 Summer Olympics.

References

External links
 Alexandra Fomina at the International Volleyball Federation
 
 
 
 

1975 births
Living people
Ukrainian women's volleyball players
Ukrainian expatriate sportspeople in Azerbaijan
Olympic volleyball players of Ukraine
Volleyball players at the 1996 Summer Olympics
Expatriate volleyball players in Azerbaijan
Place of birth missing (living people)